DeLena Johnson (born 1963) is a United States politician who sits in the Alaska House of Representatives. She is a member of the Republican Party, representing District 11.

Early life and education
Johnson moved to Alaska with her family in 1967, at the age of three. She attended Susitna Valley High School.  She then continued on to earn a BA degree in mathematics from the University of Alaska.

References

1964 births
21st-century American women politicians
21st-century American politicians
Living people
Republican Party members of the Alaska House of Representatives
People from Palmer, Alaska
University of Alaska Anchorage alumni
Women mayors of places in Alaska
Women state legislators in Alaska